The 1967 World Shotgun and Running Target Championships were separate ISSF World Shooting Championships for the trap, skeet and 50 metre running target events held in Bologna, Italy.

Medal count

Shotgun events

Men

Women

Running target events

References

1967 in Italian sport
Shooting
20th century in Bologna
S
ISSF World Shooting Championships
Shooting competitions in Italy
Sport in Bologna